Lioglyphostoma adematum is a species of sea snail, a marine gastropod mollusk in the family Pseudomelatomidae, the turrids and allies.

Description

Distribution
This marine species occurs off Guadeloupe and in the Atlantic Ocean off Northern Brazil; fossils have been found in Pliocene strata of the Bowden Formation, Jamaica; age range: 3.6 to 2.588 Ma.

References

 W. P. Woodring. 1928. Miocene Molluscs from Bowden, Jamaica. Part 2: Gastropods and discussion of results. Contributions to the Geology and Palaeontology of the West Indies

External links
 
 Gastropods.com: Lioglyphostoma adematum
  da Silva, Gutembergue Francisco, and José Carlos Nascimento de Barros. "SISTEMÁTICA DOS TURRIDAE SWAINSON, 1840 (MOLLUSCA, GASTROPODA) COLIGIDOS DA PLATAFORMA CONTINENTAL DO NORDESTE DO BRASIL."

adematum
Gastropods described in 1928